Macromia kubokaiya is a species of dragonfly in the family Macromiidae. It is endemic to Japan.

References

Insects of Japan
Macromiidae
Insects described in 1964
Taxonomy articles created by Polbot